The Essential Mix is a weekly radio show on BBC Radio 1 currently broadcast between 0:00 and 2:00 a.m. UK time on Saturday morning. Originally broadcast on 30 October 1993, the Essential Mix features contemporary DJs and music producers of electronic dance music. The show has been presented since its inception by Pete Tong and features an uninterrupted two-hour mix from a different artist each week, overlaid with occasional continuity announcements delivered by Tong. With a broadcast run in excess of 25 years, the Essential Mix is one of the longest-running programmes in the current BBC Radio 1 schedule. It is one of very few Radio 1 shows which is not broadcast live.

Background
The Essential Mix is a weekly radio show broadcast on BBC Radio 1 and features many styles of electronic dance music. It was created by Eddie Gordon, the producer of the show from the first broadcast in 1993 to 2001. In 1993, after months of receiving weekly mix shows on tape-cassette, featuring New York DJs Tony Humphries WRKS 98.7 Kiss FM and Frankie Knuckles WQHT HOT 97 FM, and recorded and mailed by U.S. Billboards Dance Editor Brian Chin, Gordon advised BBC Radio 1 that a weekly dance-mix show with DJs of different genres of music would offer more variety and a chance to promote the UK dance music scene with both notable and upcoming DJs. Gordon further encouraged the DJs he scheduled to use their musical knowledge; a high number of listeners were recording the show on cassette to listen to later, so a straight out "4 to the floor" mix was not necessarily required, allowing the DJs to include more eclectic music or offer something different from their normal selections. DJ Paul Oakenfold, after sitting with Gordon to blueprint his December 1994 Essential Mix, he produced the Goa Mix, which won a Silver Award in the Specialist Music Programme category at the 1998 Sony Radio Awards and in 2000 was voted the Best Ever Essential Mix by the BBC Radio 1 listeners. Then DJ David Holmes in June 1997 created another two hours in the history of the Essential Mix; his set included Nancy Wilson and Jimi Hendrix. In May 1998, DJ Ashley Beedle, known for his house music style, completed a two-hour reggae mix. The show has been hosted since its inception in 1993 by DJ Pete Tong, who was also the first performer.

Special events
Another Eddie Gordon initiative was to take the show on the road with live broadcasts from clubs or festivals, particularly during the summer months (Northern Hemisphere) and at New Year's Eve. The live broadcasts started from within the UK and soon broadened out as live from Ibiza, North America, Australia, South Africa, Germany, Hawaii and other destinations in Europe including Rome in Italy. One special broadcast was the BBC Radio 1 - One World millennium celebration starting with DJ Carl Cox from Bondi Beach in Sydney, Australia, before heading to Cape Town, South Africa with DJ Danny Rampling prior to broadcasting DJ Dave Pearce from Glasgow, Scotland, DJ Pete Tong from Liverpool, UK then DJ Junior Vasquez from New York, United States before closing with DJ Carl Cox, who had flown backwards across the dateline to complete a DJ world first with two millennium gigs by broadcasting from Honolulu, Hawaii.

The forerunner to this New Year's Eve Essential Mix was the transatlantic three-cities broadcast on the New Year's Eve of 1997 into 1998, with simultaneous broadcasts from three clubs directly to each dance floor with DJ Pete Tong at the Ministry Of Sound, London. DJ Todd Terry at the Nynex Arena in Manchester, UK, and finishing with DJ Eddie Baez at the Tunnel venue in Manhattan, New York, USA. It was produced by Eddie Gordon, who originated the idea of linking the three venues via ISDN broadcast.

The broadcasts from Ibiza have taken place every summer since the first Essential Mix live broadcast from Amnesia. The first ever Essential Mix from Ibiza came in the summer of 1995 Ibiza as a pre-recorded broadcast of Nicky Holloway playing live at nightclub Ku (today Privilege) on 2 July 1995.

New technologies
The advent of the internet brought the programme to an international audience for the first time (the Radio 1 website launched in 1996). In 2002 the BBC launched their 'listen again' online radio service and the Essential Mix (along with the Essential Selection) became consistently the most popular specialist music show of the whole BBC Radio network among internet users. According to BBC server logs, the show receives around 50,000 online requests per week (though this can be significantly higher, with the 2003 Ibiza show attracting more than 96,000 requests), which compares to the show's "live" audience of 80,000. Whilst demand for a podcast of the show is high, the BBC has resisted making the show available in this way due to copyright issues, but the development of peer-to-peer internet technologies has spawned a new trend in which fans of the show make recordings of mixes available to users of services such as BitTorrent and eMule. Although illegal, the BBC has taken little action against such activity.

However, in 2010, Mixriot, a website which hosted stream and download links to past Essential Mix broadcasts dating back to the first ever edition for its members, was asked to remove all its past recordings by production company Somethin' Else due to copyright infringement. The Mixriot website is still live, although it has since taken down all Essential Mix broadcasts.

Many torrent sites and internet forums still continue to provide mp3 download links to past shows, which can be found easily through internet search engines.

Essential Mix of the Year
At the end of each year, a shortlist of the most popular Essential Mixes from that year is drawn up by the BBC. Listeners are invited to vote for their favourite shortlisted mix in a poll on the Essential Mix website around two weeks before the final show of the year. The mix with the majority of the votes is given the title of "Essential Mix of the Year" and is replayed in the final show of the year. The exception for the proper nomination of the Essential Mix of the Year award was in 2007, when voting and competitions were suspended on Radio 1 until further notice, due to failures in various BBC competition voting systems. So for that year, the Essential Mix of the Year (High Contrast) was chosen by Pete Tong and the Radio 1 Essential Mix team.

1995: Tony de Vit (1995-01-08)
1997: David Holmes (1997-06-15)
1999: Basement Jaxx (1999-05-02)
2000: Dave Clarke (2000-01-16)
2001: Sander Kleinenberg (2001-06-10)
2002: Sasha & John Digweed (2002-04-07)
2004: Above and Beyond (2004-06-06)
2005: Sasha (2005-05-22)
2006: Trentemøller (2006-10-15)
2007: High Contrast (2007-10-07)
2008: Flying Lotus (2008-11-29)
2009: Sharam (2009-08-29)
2010: Swedish House Mafia (2010-09-04)
2011: Above and Beyond (2011-07-02)
2012: Nicolas Jaar (2012-05-19)
2013: Eric Prydz (2013-02-02)
2014: Caribou (2014-10-18)
2015: Ben Klock (2015-10-10)
2016: Midland (2016-02-20)
2017: Helena Hauff (2017-02-25)
2018: HAAi (2018-09-29)
2019: Josey Rebelle (2019-02-09)
2020: Sherelle (2020-11-14)
2021: Elkka (2021-11-13)
2022: KH (2022-07-09)

To mark the 500th DJ/artist to appear in the series, in April 2010 BBC Radio 1 selected ten classic Essential Mixes to reflect the show's history:

1993-10-30: First show, Pete Tong studio session.
1994-12-18: Paul Oakenfold's Goa Mix.
1996-07-28: First live Ibiza show – Danny Rampling, Sasha, Pete Tong.
1997-03-02: Daft Punk studio session.
1997-06-15: David Holmes Funk & Soul mix.
1998-05-02: Pete Tong, Sasha and Paul Oakenfold at first Creamfields.
1999-12-31: Carl Cox Millennium Eve.
2005-05-22: Sasha at Maida Vale.
2008-11-29: Flying Lotus
2009-01-17: Greg Wilson

References

External links

Essential Mix - Archive - Tracklistings
Essential Mix - Archive - Tracklistings & Downloads
Essential Mix - Archive - Tracklistings & Downloads
Essential Mix - Archive - 1993-2006 - Tracklistings & Statistics
Essential Mix - Archive & Downloads

BBC Radio 1 programmes
Electronic music radio shows
1993 radio programme debuts
1993 establishments in the United Kingdom